Jinde Cao is an Endowed Chair Professor at Southeast University, Nanjing, China. He is a Distinguished Professor, the Dean of School of Mathematics and the Director of the Research Center for Complex Systems and Network Sciences at Southeast University.

Education and career
Cao obtained his B.S. in mathematics from Anhui Normal University in 1986. He then studied applied mathematics at Yunnan University, graduating from it with M.S. in 1989 and in 1998 got his Ph.D. in the same field from Sichuan University. From 1996 to 2000, he was a professor at Yunnan University, and from July 2001 to June 2002 served as postdoc at the Department of Automation and Computer-Aided Engineering Faculty of Engineering of the Chinese University of Hong Kong. Between July 2006 and August 2008, Cao was a Royal Society Research Fellow at Brunel University in the United Kingdom and in 2014 became visiting professor at the RMIT Universityin Australia.

Awards and recognitions
Cao was named a Foreign Fellow of the Pakistan Academy of Sciences in 2016, and the same year was awarded IEEE Fellowship for contributions to the analysis of neural networks. The same year, he also became a foreign member of the Academia Europaea and in 2018 became a member of the European Academy of Sciences and Arts. In 2019 was awarded with the Obada Prize.

References

External links

20th-century births
Living people
Chinese mathematicians
Anhui Normal University alumni
Yunnan University alumni
Sichuan University alumni
Academic staff of RMIT University
Academic staff of Southeast University
Fellow Members of the IEEE
Members of Academia Europaea
Members of the European Academy of Sciences and Arts
Year of birth missing (living people)
Place of birth missing (living people)
Foreign Fellows of Pakistan Academy of Sciences
Fellows of the African Academy of Sciences
Associate Fellows of the African Academy of Sciences